Le Pot-au-feu: Journal de cuisine pratique et d'économie domestique, later called Le pot-au-feu et les Bonnes recettes réunis (1929-1956), was a biweekly cooking magazine in quarto format published in Paris from 1893 to 1956, and addressed primarily to bourgeois housewives. Its publisher was Saint-Ange Ébrard. 

In the early years, each issue began with a cooking lesson written by a professional chef. It might also include recipes, menus, and short articles. Ébrard's wife Marie also wrote a column under the name "La Vieille Catherine".

Many of the recipes published in Le Pot-au-feu were collected into Marie Ébrard's book La bonne cuisine de Madame E. Saint-Ange.

1877 magazine
There was also a magazine called Le Pot-au-feu, later renamed Journal pittoresque de gastronomie et d'économie domestique, which may or may not be related.

See also
 L'Art culinaire
 La Cuisinière Cordon Bleu

Notes

External links

1893 establishments in France
1956 disestablishments in France
Biweekly magazines published in France
Defunct magazines published in France
French cuisine
French-language magazines
Food and drink magazines
Magazines established in 1893
Magazines disestablished in 1956